Cornufer manus is a species of frog in the family Ceratobatrachidae. It is endemic to the Nakanai Mountains on New Britain Island in Papua New Guinea.

Original publication

References

Frogs of Asia
Amphibians described in 2009
Endemic fauna of Papua New Guinea
manus